Sumner High School, also known as Charles H. Sumner High School, is a St. Louis public high school that was the first high school for African-American students west of the Mississippi River in the United States. Together with Vashon High School,  Sumner was one of only two public high schools in St. Louis City for African-American students and was segregated. Established in 1875 only after extensive lobbying by some of St. Louis' African-American residents, Sumner moved to its current location in 1908.

As of the 2018–19 school year, the school had an enrollment of 267 students and 26.3 classroom teachers (on an FTE basis), for a student–teacher ratio of 10.2:1. There were 264 students (98.9% of enrollment) eligible for free lunch and 0 (0.0% of students) eligible for reduced-cost lunch.

History
Charlton Tandy led protests of the planned siting of Sumner High School in a heavily polluted area in close proximity to a lead works, lumber and tobacco warehouses, and the train station as well as brothels. He said that black students deserved clean and quiet schools the same way white students do. The location went unchanged, and Sumner High opened in 1875, the first high school opened for African Americans west of the Mississippi. The school is named after the well-known abolitionist senator Charles H. Sumner. The high school was established on Eleventh Street in St. Louis between Poplar and Spruce Street, in response to demands to provide educational opportunities, following a requirement that school boards support black education after Republicans passed the "radical" Constitution of 1865 in Missouri that also abolished slavery.

The school was moved in the 1880s because parents complained that their children were walking past the city gallows and morgue on their way to school. The current structure, built in 1908, was designed by architect William B. Ittner. Sumner was the only Black public high school in St. Louis City until the opening of Vashon High School in 1927. Famous instructors included Herman Dreer, Edward Bouchet and Charles H. Turner.

Other later Black high schools in St. Louis County were Douglass High School (opened in 1925) and Kinloch High School (1936).

In 2009, St. Louis Public School Superintendent Kevin Adams proposed several options with students and parents of how to deal with the problems of the school. He recommended improvements including using Sumner alumni to mentor current students, transferring troublesome students to different schools, and setting achievable goals for the school year.

Shootings
On March 18, 1975, two students got in a fight and one of the students tried to shoot the other but missed and killed 16-year-old bystander Stephen Goods.

On March 25, 1993, female student Lawanda Jackson shot and killed her ex-boyfriend Tony Hall in a school hallway. Jackson was convicted of first-degree murder and armed criminal action and was sentenced to life without parole.

On October 10, 1996, 17-year-old Lamon Jones was shot and killed by 15-year-old Kembert Thomas during a fight among several students. Thomas was convicted of second-degree murder.

Athletics
Sumner High's mascot is the Bulldog. Sumner's 1969 basketball team won the Missouri Class L state championship and featured future NBA and ABA players Harry Rogers and Marshall Rogers as well as David Brent who was a 6th round draft pick for the Los Angeles Lakers. Sports that are currently offered are football, volleyball, basketball, baseball, track and field, tennis, and soccer.

Notable alumni

Arthur Ashe (1943–1993), Hall of Fame tennis player
David Peaston (1957–2012), famous R&B Singer
 Ethel Hedgeman Lyle (1887–1950), founder and "Guiding Light" of Alpha Kappa Alpha Sorority, Incorporated
 Chuck Berry (1926–2017), iconic musician in Rock and Roll Hall of Fame
 Lester Bowie (1941–1999), jazz trumpeter
 Grace Bumbry (born 1937), opera singer
 Baikida Carroll (born 1947), trumpeter and composer
 Alvin Cash (1939–1999), musician
 Bill Clay (born 1931), politician
 Nate Colbert (1946–2023), baseball player
 Billy Davis Jr. (born 1938), singer, The 5th Dimension
 Juan Farrow (born 1958), tennis player
 Dick Gregory (1932–2017), comedian
 Robert Guillaume (1927–2017), actor known for portraying the character Benson DuBois on the ABC sitcom Soap and its spinoff Benson
 Victoria Clay Haley (1877–1926, class of 1895), suffragist and clubwoman
 John Hicks (1941–2006), musician
 Jessie Housley Holliman (1905–1984), educator and artist
 Julius Hunter (born 1943), television news broadcaster
 Ivan C. James Jr. (1916–2014), engineer
 Oliver Lake (born 1942), musician 
 Naomi Long Madgett (1923–2020), poet and publisher
 Robert McFerrin (1921–2006), opera singer and father of Bobby McFerrin
 Gene Moore (born 1945), basketball player
 Oliver Nelson (1932–1975), jazz musician and composer 
 Bruce Purse, musician, trumpeter and writer
 Wendell O. Pruitt (1920–1945), pioneering military pilot and Tuskegee Airman in whose honor the notorious Pruitt–Igoe housing projects were posthumously named
 Roscoe Robinson Jr. (1928–1993), first Black to reach rank of four-star general in US Army
 Harry Rogers (born 1950), basketball player
 Marshall Rogers (1953–2011), NCAA basketball scoring champion
 Darnay Scott (born 1972), former NFL player. Transferred after his sophomore season
 Ronald Townson (1934–2001), singer The 5th Dimension
 Tina Turner (born 1939), singer in Rock and Roll Hall of Fame
Arsania Williams (1886–1954), educator and clubwoman in St. Louis
 Margaret Bush Wilson (1919–2009), first Black woman to head the board of NAACP
 Olly Wilson (1937–2018), composer

References

High schools in St. Louis
Educational institutions established in 1875
William B. Ittner buildings
Historically segregated African-American schools in Missouri
Public high schools in Missouri
1875 establishments in Missouri
Buildings and structures in St. Louis